David Alan Heath (born February 10, 1976) is an American former mixed martial artist who last competed in the Light Heavyweight division. A professional competitor since from 2003 until 2012, he fought for the UFC, MFC, and King of the Cage.

Mixed martial arts career

Early career
Heath began training in mixed martial arts in 2002 and made his professional debut in 2003. Heath compiled a record of 7-0, which included a win over Sean Salmon, while mostly fighting in his home-state of Oklahoma before being signed by the UFC.

UFC
Heath made his debut for the organization at UFC 62 on August 26, 2006, against Cory Walmsley won the bout via rear-naked choke submission in the first round. Heath next fought at UFC Fight Night 7 against Canadian Victor Valimiki and won via split decision. Heath then fought against future UFC Light Heavyweight Champion against then-undefeated Lyoto Machida at UFC 70 in England. Heath was a replacement for Machida's original opponent, Forrest Griffin, who withdrew from the bout due to a nagging staph infection. Heath was handed his first professional loss via unanimous decision and the fight was pulled off the air, being replaced for more entertaining fights. Heath apologized in post-fight interview for a "boring" and "frustrating" performance, and also said that Machida has an "ultra-boring style" of fighting.

Heath then fought longtime veteran Renato Sobral at UFC 74. Prior to the fight, Heath taunted Sobral over his recent legal difficulties and then wore a shirt displaying Sobral's police mugshot to the Octagon. While angered by the display, Sobral defeated Heath by anaconda choke in the second round after horrifically beating and bloodying his opponent to the point of grotesquerie. Sobral continued to hold the choke for four seconds after Heath tapped out, which is illegal, and ignored the commands of referee Steve Mazzagatti, who tried to physically break the hold. Renato stated during the post-fight interview that "He (Heath) has to learn respect. He deserved that. He called me 'motherfucker'." Sobral also disregarded the boos from the over 11,000 fans, saying "The crowd didn't like it? Who cares! At least they had a reaction." Sobral was released from the UFC for his actions. In a later interview, Heath has stated that he does not hold a "grudge" against Sobral but is disappointed about the "black eye" that the sport of mixed martial arts suffered after the incident.

In his next bout for the UFC a year later, Heath fought Tim Boetsch at UFC 84 and was defeated in the first round after he was thrown against the cage and hit with numerous punches. Heath, having lost three consecutive fights, was released by the UFC.

Post-UFC
After a TKO win, Heath was signed by the Canada-based MFC and lost his debut against current Bellator fighter, Emanuel Newton. Heath then bounced back with a win over former MFC Light Heavyweight Champion, Roger Hollett.

Heath lost his next two fights for the organization before defeating Solomon Hutcherson at MFC 26: Retribution via knockout from a superman punch. Heath lost his last appearance for the organization against Rodney Wallace before signing with King of the Cage.

King of the Cage
Heath signed with King of the Cage and won his first two fights for the organization in 2012.

Mixed martial arts record

|-
| Win
| align=center| 18–7
| Chad Herrick
| Decision (split)
| KOTC: Unification
| 
| align=center| 3
| align=center| 5:00
| Tulsa, Oklahoma, United States
| 
|-
| Win
| align=center| 17–7
| Sidiah Parker
| TKO (punches)
| KOTC: Breakthrough
| 
| align=center| 2
| align=center| 4:48
| Tulsa, Oklahoma, United States
| 
|-
| Loss
| align=center| 16–7
| Rodney Wallace
| Decision (unanimous)
| MFC 27
| 
| align=center| 3
| align=center| 5:00
| Edmonton, Alberta, Canada
|Return to Light Heavyweight.
|-
| Win
| align=center| 16–6
| Solomon Hutcherson
| KO (Superman punch)
| MFC 26: Retribution
| 
| align=center| 2
| align=center| 3:46
| Edmonton, Alberta, Canada
|Middleweight debut.
|-
| Win
| align=center| 15–6
| Jason Kuchera
| TKO (strikes)
| Heat XC 5: Punishment
| 
| align=center| 3
| align=center| 4:45
| Edmonton, Alberta, Canada
| 
|-
| Win
| align=center| 14–6
| Jason Freeman
| KO (head kick)
| FCF: Freestyle Cage Fighting 38
| 
| align=center| 1
| align=center| 4:18
| Tulsa, Oklahoma, United States
| 
|-
| Loss
| align=center| 13–6
| Mike Nickels
| Submission (rear-naked choke)
| MFC 22
| 
| align=center| 3
| align=center| 4:02
| Enoch, Alberta, Canada
| 
|-
| Win
| align=center| 13–5
| Wayne Cole
| KO (punch)
| FCF: Freestyle Cage Fighting
| 
| align=center| 2
| align=center| 2:42
| Oklahoma, United States
| 
|-
| Win
| align=center| 12–5
| Shawn Dezee
| KO (punches)
| FCF: Freestyle Cage Fighting
| 
| align=center| 1
| align=center| 2:47
| Durant, Oklahoma, United States
| 
|-
| Loss
| align=center| 11–5
| Travis Galbraith
| Decision (split)
| MFC 21
| 
| align=center| 3
| align=center| 5:00
| Enoch, Alberta, Canada
| 
|-
| Win
| align=center| 11–4
| Roger Hollett
| Submission (guillotine choke)
| MFC 20
| 
| align=center| 1
| align=center| 1:58
| Enoch, Alberta, Canada
| 
|-
| Loss
| align=center| 10–4
| Emanuel Newton
| Submission (rear-naked choke)
| MFC 18: Famous
| 
| align=center| 2
| align=center| 1:19
| Enoch, Alberta, Canada
| 
|-
| Win
| align=center| 10–3
| Shepard Owens
| TKO (punches)
| Freestyle Cage Fighting
| 
| align=center| 1
| align=center| 1:19
| Shawnee, Oklahoma, United States
| 
|-
| Loss
| align=center| 9–3
| Tim Boetsch
| TKO (throw and punches)
| UFC 81
| 
| align=center| 1
| align=center| 4:52
| Las Vegas, Nevada, United States
| 
|-
| Loss
| align=center| 9–2
| Renato Sobral
| Technical Submission (anaconda choke)
| UFC 74
| 
| align=center| 2
| align=center| 3:30
| Las Vegas, Nevada, United States
| 
|-
| Loss
| align=center| 9–1
| Lyoto Machida
| Decision (unanimous)
| UFC 70
| 
| align=center| 3
| align=center| 5:00
| Manchester, England, United Kingdom
| 
|-
| Win
| align=center| 9–0
| Victor Valimaki
| Decision (split)
| UFC Fight Night: Sanchez vs. Riggs
| 
| align=center| 3
| align=center| 5:00
| San Diego, California, United States
| 
|-
| Win
| align=center| 8–0
| Cory Walmsley
| Submission (rear-naked choke)
| UFC 62: Liddell vs. Sobral
| 
| align=center| 1
| align=center| 2:32
| Las Vegas, Nevada, United States
| 
|-
| Win
| align=center| 7–0
| Sean Salmon
| Submission
| FF 5: Korea vs USA
| 
| align=center| 1
| align=center| 0:50
| McAllen, Texas, United States
| 
|-
| Win
| align=center| 6–0
| Rob Wince
| TKO (doctor stoppage)
| FCF: Clash of the Titans
| 
| align=center| 2
| align=center| 5:00
| Tulsa, Oklahoma, United States
| 
|-
| Win
| align=center| 5–0
| Chase Watson
| Submission (armbar)
| EFL: Battle at the Brady 4
| 
| align=center| 1
| align=center| 1:40
| Tulsa, Oklahoma, United States
| 
|-
| Win
| align=center| 4–0
| Rudy Lindsey
| Submission
| EFL: Extreme Fighting League
| 
| align=center| 1
| align=center| 1:40
| Tulsa, Oklahoma, United States
| 
|-
| Win
| align=center| 3–0
| Doug Sour
| Submission (achilles lock)
| KOTC 42: Buckeye Nuts
| 
| align=center| 1
| align=center| N/A
| Concho, Oklahoma, United States
| 
|-
| Win
| align=center| 2–0
| Rob Webb
| Decision
| EFL 12: Extreme Kickboxing 12
| 
| align=center| 3
| align=center| 5:00
| Dayton, Ohio, United States
| 
|-
| Win
| align=center| 1–0
| Adam Gregg
| TKO (referee stoppage)
| Rock and Rumble 1
| 
| align=center| 2
| align=center| N/A
| Tulsa, Oklahoma, United States
|

References

External links

American male mixed martial artists
Mixed martial artists from Oklahoma
Middleweight mixed martial artists
Light heavyweight mixed martial artists
Sportspeople from Tulsa, Oklahoma
Living people
1976 births
People from Nowata, Oklahoma
Ultimate Fighting Championship male fighters